Kunle Remi, birth name Oyekunle Opeyemi Oluwaremi   (born 18 October 1988) is a Nigerian actor, producer, filmmaker, content creator, host, motivational speaker, entrepreneur, and model. He has appeared in Falling, Family Forever, Tinsel, and Aníkúlápó He won the 7th edition of Gulder Ultimate Search in 2010. While studying at the New York Film Academy, he was simultaneously hosting an Internet TV Channel, Celebville 360. As a successful venture, he made an appearance at the Academy Awards nomination event in Beverly Hills, his first significant hosting appearance. By 2012, he was already cast in his first movie Heavy Beauty produced by Grace Edwin Okon and directed by Stanlee Ohikhuare. Though he graduated in 2014, he returned and studied filmmaking and directing, which he graduated from in 2015.

Early Life and education 
The Nollywood actor was born in Benue State on 18 October 1988. His family relocated to Ibadan when he was a child. His parents raised him and his five siblings in a Christian household. As a child, he was a part of his church's drama group. As a teenager, he discovered a passion for acting and became a youth drama teacher while living in Ibadan.

Once graduated from high school, he studied Fisheries and Wildlife Management at the University of Ibadan. He then attended Sheffield University and studied Tourism and Hospitality Management. Once his degrees were completed, he moved to New York City to study acting, filmmaking, and directing at the New York Film Academy and graduated in 2014.

Early Work 

Remi started acting professionally in 2011, after winning Gulder Ultimate Search in 2010. The actor's first on-screen appearance came in 2012s Heavy Beauty. In 2014, he began performing stunts in Kpains: The Frest of Souls, and spending 2015 landing roles in short films Sister's Keeper, Sting, ‘’Hex’’ and being cast for the television series The Getaway where he played Oliseh. His fame grew with his role in Out of Luck, Deluded and Mrs. & Mrs Johnson.

Remi's breakthrough role came from his role in Falling (September 2015), where he played a husband left in a coma after a tragic accident. Adesua Etomi-Wellington won the Africa Magic Viewers’ Choice Awards Best Actress in a Drama for her role in the same film.

Career

2016 

On 5 February 2016, Any Other Monday was released and portrays the trials and tribulations of love and marriage. He went on to star in a similar film – highlighting the struggle and illusions of love – which was released 9 September. Additionally, throughout the year, the actor starred in two television series. The first, Lincoln's Clan Evolution, depicts a Nigerian billionaire and his family and follows their trials and tribulations. The actor played Eric and completed his role in 2017. The second is Tinsel (TV series), a Nigerian soap opera and Africa's longest-surviving television series that began filming in 2008. Remi was cast in 2016 as a day player and continued with his role of Zane into 2017.

2017 
In 2017, Remi accepted various alternate roles throughout the year. He took on the role of Lolu in Tiwa's Baggage, where he represented the struggles of an abandoned woman with a child. On 12 April, Sobi's Mystic was released and allowed the actor a slightly lighter role in this romantic drama film. Sobi, the actor's character, finds his promiscuous tendencies land him in trouble when the woman he finds and becomes drawn to doesn't reciprocate his feelings. Digging him deeper into who she is. The film received a rating of 4/5 from the Nollywood Reinvented for its unpredictability and details. A few months later, Alter Ego (24 July) was released. Written by Jude Martins, the film tells the story of a lawyer who prosecutes sex offenders and the lengths she will go to find justice in whatever she sees fit. Yet, as a fellow victim herself, she is driven by her own sexual drive and power, no matter the time and place. The film was nominated for Best Film with Social Messages and Film with Best Production Design at the Best of Nollywood Awards. As well as leading roles Omotola Jalade Ekeinde and Remi were nominated for Best Kiss in a Film. In September, Surprise Wedding released its adaptation of an arranged marriage. Remi, who plays Tunde, is surprised on his birthday with a wedding rather than a birthday party. He is forced to walk the isles as his inheritance is tied to his marital status. To finish off his diverse on-screen roles, the actor took on the breast cancer awareness film Purple Hearts.

2018 
He began his year starring in Stronger Together, where the actor plays Jide, a pediatrician who contemplates suicide due to his family pressuring him into marriage. This leads to a late-night sorrowing session in a bar and meeting a new connection that could very much alter his path. By 3 February, Forbidden was released and was a hit. The actor played a role in this television series that follows forbidden lovers who are outed by an ex. The Eve, released on 30 March 2018, was considered "the most colorful and beautiful shot film," with an eye-pleasing cast. The romantic comedy features Remi as Audu and Adeolu Adefarasin as Funsho. The storyline followed Funsho's risky decisions when he meets someone else at his bachelorette party. The film appeared on Netflix on 12 October 2020.

2019 
Remi starred in Boys Will Be Boys, released on 14 February, where Mike lies to his soon-to-wed wife about the wild bachelor party that comes back to haunt him. Surprisingly, on the same day, Sin City is released. He and co-star, Yvonne Nelson, play a couple who decide a vacation is the best way to boost their relationship but are tested in unexpected ways. While he played significant roles in these productions, Gold Statue, released on 17 May 2019, had the actor leading alongside Gabriel Afolayan. Director Tade Ogidan, CEO of OGD Pictures, came out of an eight-year hiatus to see the project through after it was written in 1991. It was nominated for Africa Movie Academy Award for Best Nigerian Film and won Best Actor in a Lead role, Best Sound, and Best Use of Makeup and of Nigerian Costume in a film. As well as, the Best Movie of The Year, Director of The Year and Best Production Design. The film follows Wale (Afolayan) and Chike (Remi) who go in search of the treasured "Gold Statue" which is believed to be a deity inherited by their generation. Quagmire, released 3 December, was another film Remi starred in alongside actress Matilda Obaseki. The actor's character, Kolade, receives a shocking surprise when his wife invites another woman into their home to spice up their love life. Although mainly for a mother-in-law who wants a grandchild. Considered a great acting piece as he was able to let the "character shine through him."

2020 
Despite the coronavirus pandemic starting, Remi featured in lead or supporting roles in upwards of 14 films. His first significant role was in JOCA (Just A Call Away), which was a push to help those needing to exercise the necessary precautions during the pandemic. Remi plays Richard who has just come home from overseas and is showing symptoms of the virus. His pregnant wife, played by Bolaji Ogunmola, is worried and wants him to be properly tested, yet he would rather trust the Lord's help than take responsibility. The short 35-minute film looked to help those in isolation centers and bring ease to the process needing to take place. Mama Drama (1 October) is considered one of the actor's top 10 films. The Nigerian drama film hosts a mecca of film stars and explores the experience of a woman who undergoes many miscarriages and hires her assistant as her surrogate. Later that month, Remi co-produced and was a part of fellow Nollywood actress, Joy Idoko, new film Lemonade. The actress turned producer, wanted to highlight toxic relationships as a single mother in following her dreams. With plenty of short film experience, 12 Seasons was another notch on his belt as the movie highlights the struggles of newlywed couples. However, his role in Introducing the Kujus (now, streaming on Amazon Prime Video) grossed ₦10 million and went on to win Best Writing for the 2022 Africa Magic Viewers' Choice Awards.

2021 
The Prophetess, released on 2 April, follows Ajoke the prophetess and his Lagos-based OAP, Dipo, played by Remi. The pair get into some trouble when her remarks – which had been deemed true in the past and posted on social media – are misinterpreted and produce a frenzy over a football match in town. His first major film of the year was Gone. Initially screened at the Calgary Black Film Festival, it officially came out to the public on 16 July 2021. In his first Netflix film, the story details how a man's search for better in New York City was turned completely upside down. 25 years later, he returns home only to find his family moved on without him. Although the actor plays a supporting role as a stockbroker, the film is considered one of the best in Nollywood for 2021. Though his following role, as playboy turned lover Akinola ‘Owoblow’ Owolabi, would give him a run for his money. 13 Letters show the backlash sleeping around can get you. Once all the women got together to shame his name, a public relations agent (PR) must help him fix himself. With co-star Bimbo Ademoye, his inevitable love interest, their chemistry, and the story's overall plot is a fan favorite. October was a busy month for the actor. The Nollywood crime thriller Hide and Seek, directed by Tolu Awobiyi and Adekunle-Bryan Oyetunde, follows Remi's lead role as James. He must protect the shady politician, deal with an obsessive girlfriend, and figure out the snitch and others’ hidden agendas. Nothing can fail; as long as he makes the right moves.  Later that month April Showers was released. While a 40-year-old entrepreneur realizes she may be too late to begin a family, she decides to use a multi-millionaire son to help her. Currently out on Amazon Prime Video, the film sits at a 4.5/5 rating and was enjoyed by its audience. His first Christmas film, A Naija Christmas by Kunle Afolayan, was released on 16 December and was Remi's first official leading role in a Netflix original film. The actor plays Ugo, one of three brothers who have been sent into a competition by their mother's wish. Who can find a wife first?

2022 
Throughout the year, Remi landed roles in Saint Oyinda, Borrowed Wealth, Treasury, the television series Deserted, and  Anikulapo by Kunle Afolayan.  Saro, played by Remi, is a simple traditional textile weaver who becomes intertwined with Queen Arolake who is played by previous co-star Bimbo Ademoye. As she resents her marriage to the King, she and Saro fall in love. This romance leads him towards death, and as he tries to find his way out, he faces some unconventional decisions. Including betraying the queen and dealing with the consequences of his untamed powers. In its first week, it was viewed for 8,730,000 hours, became one of the top 10 films in 24 countries on Netflix, and was listed as the number one film in Nigeria in its first week. The actor finished the year with the release of the crime thriller Woke, released on 4 November. The movie is about a P.I.’s mission to retrieve the kidnapped daughter of a renowned Kingpin. On 23 December, Ijakumo (The Born Again Stripper) was released. The story follows the daughter of a powerful spiritualist, Asabi, who is going to destroy her ex's life. Remi plays the shady Pastor Jide, who she is trying to destroy. A man of God yet a man who can also commit atrocities.

Producing 
Sting, a short film released in 2013, was produced by the actor and screened at the Zimbabwe Film Festival. Later, in 2019, Lemonade was produced and distributed across multiple streaming platforms in Nigeria, including DStv and YouTube.

TV hosting 
While studying at the New York Film Academy, Remi worked as a host for an internet TV channel, Celebville 360. In 2013 he attended his first appearance reporting live at the Academy Awards nomination event in Beverly Hills, California. As his work on the screen expanded, his next hosting job was not until 2021, when he returned to where it all started. As a taskmaster, he returned to the Gulder Ultimate Search Season 12 with fellow host Toke Makinwa. In the following year, the actor had the opportunity to be the green carpet host of the '2022 Glo Dance Battle of the Year' with Moet Abebe. He also had a judging role in Dance Naija Dance by Zee World alongside Sashin Kandhaj, Kenneth Agabata, Uraysha Ramrachia and hosts Daniel K. Daniel and Pelumi Busari. Starting 6 August, the show ran every Saturday and Sunday for 10 weeks and included 16 top finalists from all over the country. Later that same year, on 3 and 4 November 2022, alongside 51 inspiring speakers, Remi anchored the Woman in Management, Business and Public Service (WIMBIZ) Africa where author Chimamanda Ngozi Adichi was a keynote speaker.  Remi then appeared on 23 November as the moderator at the Sterling Leadership Series: Born in Blackness, where the series interviewed journalist and author Howard French. Then to the Culturati, the largest art and cultural event in Nigeria, where they partnered with Creative Youth Community Development Initiative (CYCDI) – Solution17 to create the "Lagos Green Economy in Arts and Culture." The 27 November 2022, event was hosted by Remi, Osas Ighodaro, Bianca Ugowanne, and Princess Marinay. By 21 December, the actor went back to the creative side and hosted the Fuze Talent Hunt. Produced by Stanbic IBTC Holdings Pension Managers Limited, the talent hunt sought out "indigenous talents and help them explore their creativity and business prowess through the initiative."

Modelling 
Remi began his modeling career with ISIS models at the age of 24. He has since been featured in ad campaigns for brands like Airtel (formerly Zain), ARISE Magazine, DStv, MTN Nigeria, The Reele Magazine, and Diamond Bank (now Access Bank).

Personal life 
Despite keeping his personal life private, Remi opened up in December 2022 and spoke on depression, stating how overwhelmed he felt at various points on his journey as an actor. As he stated, "I was thinking too much of my career, am I doing enough, am I enough, am I with the right person, so many thoughts in my mind."

Future Projects 
Remi is co-founder of 1810 Empire Studios, founded in 2012 and was previously listed as The 7th Media Entertainment. Relaunching as 1810 in 2022, the global talent management firm and production company looks to create entertainment for a wide range of media platforms. Their three verticals, 1810 management, 1810 Studios, and 1810 Impact; all three have future projects in the works. 1810 Studios has two feature films currently active – one highlighting marriage and the other digging deep into the finite reality of time – a limited series on love chronicles with the youth demographic and a talk-variety show. 1810 Impact looks to help those in need. The actor is the founder of Men Against Rape and Violence (MARV), a social imperative bringing awareness of the impact sexual assault has on men, women, and youth through visual stories.

Filmography

Film

Television

Awards and nominations

See also
 List of Nigerian actors

References 

1988 births
Living people
21st-century Nigerian male actors
Male actors from Benue State
New York Film Academy alumni
Nigerian Christians
Nigerian male film actors
Nigerian male models
Participants in Nigerian reality television series
People from Gboko
University of Ibadan alumni
Yoruba male actors
Yoruba male models
Nigerian male television actors
Nigerian film award winners